Sarada Mohanty (7 March 1925 – 8 July 2015) was an Indian politician. He was a Member of Parliament, representing Odisha in the Rajya Sabha the upper house of India's Parliament as a member of the Janata Dal.

Mohanty died on 8 July 2015, at the age of 90.

References

1925 births
2015 deaths
Janata Dal politicians
Rajya Sabha members from Odisha